The National Development Plan 2030 is an important policy document of the South African government drafted in August 2012 by the National Planning Commission, a special ministerial body first constituted in 2009 by President Jacob Zuma. The Plan contains a series of proposals to eliminate poverty and reduce inequality by 2030.

References

2012 in South Africa
Economy of South Africa
2030
South Africa